Edward Cragg may refer to:

Edward Cragg (pilot) (1918–1943), American fighter ace of World War II
Edward Joseph Cragg (1887–1953), civil servant, businessman and political figure in Nova Scotia, Canada